Poovilangu is a 1984 Indian Tamil-language film directed by Ameerjan, starring Murali and Kuyili, the latter in her acting debut. It was released on 23 March 1984.

Plot

Cast 
Murali as Pandiyan
Kuyili as Saraswathi
Mohan as Senthil
Mohanapriya as Priya
Senthamarai as Raja Manikkam
Charle
Radha Ravi

Production 
Poovilangu marked the directorial debut of Ameerjan who earlier assisted K. Balachander. The film marked the acting debuts of Murali, son of Kannada director S. Siddalingaiah (in Tamil) and Kuyili. Mohan, who went on to become a popular television actor, also made his acting debut in the film and his performance in the film earned him the sobriquet Poovilangu Mohan.

Soundtrack 
The music for this film was composed by Ilaiyaraaja and lyrics were written by Vairamuthu.

Reception 
Jayamanmadhan of Kalki appreciated the film for various aspects, including way the characters were developed without any confusion, and the screenplay.

References

External links 
 

1980s romance films
1980s Tamil-language films
1984 directorial debut films
1984 films
Films directed by Ameerjan
Films scored by Ilaiyaraaja
Indian romance films